Coles Mills is a ghost town in Delaware County, in the U.S. state of Ohio. The precise location of the extinct town is unknown to the GNIS.

History
A post office called Coles Mills was established in 1841, and remained in operation until 1856. The namesake mills were a sawmill and gristmill operated by Joseph C. Cole.

References

Geography of Delaware County, Ohio
Ghost towns in Ohio